Jogaranjan Halder, is an Indian politician member of All India Trinamool Congress.  He is an MLA, elected from the  Kulpi constituency in the 2001 West Bengal state assembly election.  In 2011, 2016 and 2021 assembly election he was re-elected from the same constituency.

References 

Trinamool Congress politicians from West Bengal
Living people
People from South 24 Parganas district
West Bengal MLAs 2021–2026
Year of birth missing (living people)